Bernard Gerrit (Burny) Bos (Haarlem, 8 April 1944) is a Dutch producer, scenarist and children's book writer. He also works as an actor in children's programmes on radio and T.V.

Career

Bos started working with the AVRO-radio. In 1975 he received an honorable mention from the "Zilveren Reissmicrofoon" jury for the Ko de boswachtershow (radio) and in 1977 for Radio Lawaaipapegaai. In 1981 the Zilveren Nipkowschijf jury gave him another honorable mention for the TV-series Lawaaipapegaai. In 1983 he received the Zilveren Reissmicrofoon for his entire radio-oeuvre.

From 1984 till 1989 Bos was the head of the youth department in the VPRO. Under his supervision programs like Theo en Thea, Mevrouw Ten Kate, Max Laadvermogen, Rembo en Rembo, Achterwerk in de kast and Buurman Bolle developed. In 1989 he began his own company BosBros and he signed another year contract with the AVRO.

For the AVRO he produced programmes like Het Zakmes, Kinderen van waterland, Dag Juf, tot morgen, de Ko de boswachtershow, Hoe laat begint het schilderij, Mijn Franse tante Gazeuse and Otje. He was proclaimed as the "broadcaster of the year" in 1998.

In the recent years, he is focused on producing films. Working with his society Bos Bros, he produced a number of books by Annie M.G. Schmidt to family films. He received the Gouden Kalf film prize for the best feature film in 1999 with The Flying Liftboy (Abeltje) and in 2002 with Undercover Kitty (Minoes). Schmidt's books Otje and Ibbeltje were adapted into a television series.

Burny Bos was the guest of honor at the Dutch Film Festival in late September 2007. For that occasion he asked director Diederik van Rooijen to direct the short film  Een trui voor kip Saar .

He also showed that he was worried about the future of the youth film in Netherlands. Quality films are becoming increasingly difficult to make. According to him, the children's genre on television and in the cinema suffers from "ploppification".

Radio programmes 
 Ko de Boswachtershow (1974-1984)
 Radio Lawaaipapegaai (1976-1978)

Television programmes
"De Lawaaipapegaai presenteert: "Papelagaaiwaai" (1978-1982)
Villa Achterwerk - Central presentation as Lange Jaap (1984/1985)
Opzoek naar Yolanda - Lange Jaap (1984)
Buurman Bolle - Verteller (1989)
Ko de Boswachtershow - Ko de Boswachter (television series) (1990)
Studio Trappelzak
Hoe laat begint het schilderij
Dag huis, dag tuin, dag opbergschuur
Lawaai Papegaai (television version of this radio programme) (also with Wieteke van Dort)

Bibliography 
Knofje, waar zit je? (1980)
Oma Fladder (1981)
Klim maar op mijn rug zei de krokodil (1982)
Circus Grote Meneer (1985)
Professor Koosje (1986)
Bonkie en Uk (1987)
Kikker in je bil die er nooit meer uit wil (1987)
Professor Koosje bolleboosje (1987)
De groeten van Knofje (1988)
Dubbeldik zand op je boterham (1990)
Mijn vader woont in Rio (1990)
Valentino de kikker (1990)
Familie Mol-de-Mol staat er goed op (1994)
Bij de familie Mol-de-Mol is alles oké (1995)
Familie Mol-de-Mol zit hoog en droog (1995)
Ot Jan Dikkie! (1997)
Alexander de Grote, Pluim van de maand (January 2001)

Filmography 
Kinderen van Waterland (television series) (1990)
Het Zakmes (both film and television series) (1992)
Vinaya (1992)
Dag juf, tot morgen (television series) (1995)
Captain Cockpit (1994)
De jongen die niet meer praatte (both film and television series) (1995)
Always yours, for never (1996)
Mijn Franse tante Gazeuse (television series) (1996)
Otje (television series) (1998)
The Flying Liftboy (both film and television series) (1998)
Knofje (television series) (2001)
Undercover Kitty (both film and television series) (2001)
Ja zuster, nee zuster (both film and television series) (2002)
Pluk van de Petteflet (both film and television series) (2004)
Ibbeltje (television series) (2004)
Het paard van Sinterklaas (2005)
Waltz (2006)
Een trui voor kip Saar (2007)
Waar is het paard van Sinterklaas? (2007)
Wiplala (2014)

References

External links
 Interview
 
 films and television series

Living people
1944 births
Dutch screenwriters
Dutch male screenwriters
20th-century Dutch male writers
21st-century Dutch male writers
Dutch film producers
Dutch children's writers